Sergey Betov and Mikhail Elgin were the defending champions but lost to Hsieh Cheng-peng and Yang Tsung-hua in the semifinals.

Denis Matsukevich and Andrei Vasilevski won the title after defeating Hsieh Cheng-peng and Yang Tsung-hua 6–4, 5–7, [10–5] in the final.

Seeds

Draw

References
 Main Draw

Samarkand Challenger - Doubles